The 2016 Denmark Super Series Premier was the ninth Super Series tournament of the 2016 BWF Super Series. The tournament took place in Odense, Denmark on October 18–23, 2016, and had a total prize of $700,000.

Men's singles

Seeds

Top half

Bottom half

Finals

Women's singles

Seeds

Top half

Bottom half

Finals

Men's doubles

Seeds

Top half

Bottom half

Finals

Women's doubles

Seeds

Top half

Bottom half

Finals

Mixed doubles

Seeds

Top half

Bottom half

Finals

References

External links
 Denmark Open  at www.badmintondenmark.com
 BWF World Superseries at www.bwfworldsuperseries.com

Denmark Open
Denmark Super Series Premier
Sport in Odense